Narcisse Chaillou (12 March 1835 – 1916) was a French painter famous for his genre scenes of Paris and Brittany life.

He moved to Paris in 1870 and became the student of Léon Bonnat (1833–1922), Ernest Hébert (1817–1908) et Jean-Baptiste-Camille Corot (1796–1875). He exhibited his works in many French Salons, among them the Salon de Paris and the Salon des artistes français. He moved to Brittany in 1880. The artworks of Narcisse Chaillou belong to the public collections and museums in the cities of Rennes, Nantes, Morlaix and Vitré.

The painter died in Guémémé-sur-Scorff (Brittany) in 1916.

Notes

External links
 Artnet Photos of Narcisse Chaillou's artworks
 Official Pontivy city website - List and biographies of famous people of Pontivy

1835 births
1916 deaths
19th-century French painters
French male painters
20th-century French painters
20th-century French male artists
19th-century French male artists